Crathis may refer to:
Crati, a river of southern Italy
Krathis, a river of southern Greece